Wolverine Creek is a stream in Bourbon County, Kansas, in the United States.

Wolverine Creek was named for the wolves seen there by early settlers.

See also
List of rivers of Kansas

References

Rivers of Bourbon County, Kansas
Rivers of Kansas